Viva La Decadence is the debut album by English rock band King Lizard. A music video of the title track Viva La Decadence has been released a month prior to the album.

Track listing 
"Viva La Decadence"
"Rain on You"
"Rock n' Roll Me"
"Hell Yeah"
"Video Lover"
"Kan't Kill Rock n' Roll"
"Never Be Mine"
"Not for Me"
"Riot"
"Taste the Hate"
"Outrageous"
"Late Nite Dynamite"

Performers
 Flash Sawyer - vocals, piano
 Niro Knox - guitar, backing vocals
 Alice Rain - bass guitar
 Sky London - drums

References

External links
 King Lizard official website

2010 debut albums
King Lizard albums
Albums produced by Chris Tsangarides